Eleanor Emery, CMG (23 December 1918 – 22 June 2007) was  High Commissioner to Botswana from 1973 to 1977: the first British woman to reach that rank.

She was born in Glasgow but educated at Western Canada High School; and the University of Glasgow. She joined the Dominions Office in 1941  and was Assistant Private Secretary to the Secretary of State from  1942 to 1945. After that she served in Bechuanaland Ottawa, New Delhi and Pretoria. Appointed an Officer of HM Diplomatic Service in 1966, she was Head of the South Asia Department at the CRO then the  Pacific Dependent Territories Department before her Botswana appointment. She was Governor of the Commonwealth Institute from 1980 to 1985.

References

People educated at Western Canada High School
Alumni of the University of Glasgow
High Commissioners of the United Kingdom to Botswana
1918 births
Diplomats from Glasgow
2007 deaths
Companions of the Order of St Michael and St George
British women ambassadors